David Holloway may refer to:

 David Holloway (American football) (born 1983), linebacker in the National Football League
 David Holloway (baritone), American opera singer, in Le comte Ory etc.
 David P. Holloway (1809–1883), U.S. Representative from Indiana
 David R. Holloway (1924–1995), literary editor at the Daily Telegraph, see List of winners and shortlisted authors of the Booker Prize for Fiction